Hamichlol ( "The Entirety") is a censored wiki-based Internet encyclopedia project for the Haredi public. Most of the articles on the site are exact copies (as of the date they were copied) of articles from the Hebrew Wikipedia or re-edited versions of Hebrew Wikipedia articles, adapted for the ultra-Orthodox reader, while original articles currently constitute only a small portion of all the articles on the site. The site is managed and operated by the Institute for Literacy and Proper Knowledge, which was established for the purpose of creating the site.

The editor community of the site censors mainly any mentioning of homosexuality, information that contradicts a creationist worldview, and behaviors deemed immodest. The site is referred to by the site owners as an aspeklaria, which means in Latin "mirror", as it is a re-edited edition of the Hebrew Wikipedia.

The site was launched on January 11, 2015. As of October 2, 2020 the site contained 279,979 articles, which is about three thousand more than the Hebrew Wikipedia. However, many of the site's articles, such as the one on God, are being edited and reviewed for compliance with Talmudic law and are not available to the general public.

As of October 2, 2020 the site's Alexa's ranking was 222 in Israel.

Background
In 2014 the Israeli Hasidic rabbi Yosef Kaminer founded the Institute for Literacy and Proper Knowledge through which the site would be produced. The site is intended for the Haredi (Ultra-Orthodox Jews) public who are very conservative and refrain from using Wikipedia's content according to their stringent interpretations of halakha. Hamichlol aspires to be "the largest Jewish encyclopedia in history, which includes articles on all issues pertaining to the Torah, Jewish values and the history of the Jewish people, but also knowledge pertaining to mankind and from all the secular" ( [transliteration: hulin]) "fields–written in clean language according to the Jewish worldview."

Operation
Originally, the site of the site imported the entire Hebrew Wikipedia  and re-edited or deleted the content which they considered  not proper for the Torah-observant public, and specifically the ultra-Orthodox readers. The content is imported from the Hebrew Wikipedia in accordance with Wikipedia's free license, which enables editors to perform such a "split". It is easy to find information which was omitted by comparing specific articles on the site with the parallel articles at the Hebrew Wikipedia. Examples  include:

 In the Biology article,  initially copied entirely from the Hebrew Wikipedia and then re-edited, the "Evolution" section was renamed to "The Order of the Creation of Creatures" and the content of this section was changed so that instead of saying that all organisms on the Earth have descended from a common ancestor, it was changed to say that all forms of life were created in the Six Days of Genesis.
 In the Beit Zeit article,  initially copied entirely from the Hebrew Wikipedia and then re-edited, the mentioning of the "Dinosaur footprints" site in Israel was omitted, because it is a site which contains a layer of ancient rock that contains some 200 traces of dinosaur tracks from tens of millions of years ago. Other articles and references on the site which present dates or periods that contradict the age of the world according to the Torah also are removed from all the imported articles.
 In the article about The Holocaust,  copied  from the Hebrew Wikipedia and then re-edited, the mentioning in the introduction that homosexuals were also murdered by Nazi Germany in World War II was completely removed. Other articles and references on the site to homosexuality or homosexuals are removed from all imported articles.
 Because many Haredi avoid pictures of women,  in articles about prominent historical female figures the portraits of the women are replaced with pictures of their graves. Furthermore, pictures that include women, including historical pictures or group photos showing  of men and women (for example, a photo of the thirty-fourth government of Israel's cabinet) are photoshopped to remove women.

The owners of the website  state that in the instances in which imported articles from Wikipedia contain content deemed problematic, the editorial team of the website will gradually review the articles to determine whether the content is appropriate: problematic articles which also contain proper content will be rewritten, while the articles with totally inappropriate content will eventually be permanently deleted. As of August 25, 2018, some of the articles that are most sought-after at the Hebrew Wikipedia but are temporarily blocked awaiting  review  include: Gal Gadot, Ofra Haza, Sigmund Freud, New Testament, Academy Awards, Human evolution, Woman, Status quo (Israel), Age of Enlightenment, Breast cancer, Tower of Babel, Muslims, The Simpsons, Apocalypse, Table tennis, Homo, Platonic love, Sport in Israel, Bourekas films, Handball, Race (human categorization), Jewish and democratic state, Maccabiah Games, Catholic Church, Satire, Paganism and Samaritanism.

Copyrights 
All content on the site which was originally imported from Wikipedia is provided under the free license CC-BY-SA. The copyrights of the rest of the site's content is reserved to the Institute for Literacy and Proper Knowledge.

See also

Haredi Judaism#Newspapers and publications
Jewish views on evolution#Orthodox scientists respond to Darwin
Enciclopedia Libre Universal en Español
Baidu Baike (Chinese online encyclopedia censored per government requirements)
List of online encyclopedias
Conservapedia

References

External links
Official website 

Internet properties established in 2015
Israeli online encyclopedias
Wikipedia-derived encyclopedias
Hebrew-language websites
2014 establishments in Israel
21st-century encyclopedias
Haredi media
Judaism websites
Censorship in Judaism